Kneecapping is a form of malicious wounding, often as torture, in which the victim is injured in the knee. The injury is typically inflicted by a low-velocity gunshot to the knee pit with a handgun. The term is considered a misnomer by medical professionals because only a very small minority of victims suffer damage to the kneecap. A review of eighty kneecapping victims found that only two had a fractured kneecap. Some victims have their elbows and ankles shot as well.

Treatment 

The severity of the injury can vary from simple soft tissue damage to a knee joint fracture with neurovascular damage. The latter requires several weeks in hospital and intensive outpatient physiotherapy for recovery. If the damage is too great, amputation may be necessary, but this rarely occurs. In Northern Ireland thirteen people had their legs amputated as a consequence of limb punishment shootings over the duration of the Troubles. In the long term it is estimated that one out of five victims will walk with a limp for the rest of their lives.

History 

During the Troubles in Northern Ireland, paramilitaries considered themselves to be law enforcers in their own areas. They used limb shootings to punish drug pushers and child molesters. If the crime was considered to be grave, the victim was also shot in the ankles and elbows, leaving them with six gunshot wounds (colloquially known as a six pack). Approximately 2,500 people were victims of these paramilitary attacks, known as ‘punishment shootings’ at the time, through the duration of the conflict. Those who were attacked carried a social stigma with them.

The Red Brigades, an Italian militant organization, employed these kinds of attacks to warn their opponents. They used the method to punish at least 75 people up to December 1978.

The Bangladesh Police have started kneecapping in the country since 2009 to punish the opposition and preventing them from participating in protests against the government. Human Rights Watch (HRW) has published a report on kneecapping in Bangladesh.

During the Israeli–Palestinian conflict, Israeli soldiers have been accused of systematically kneecapping over 100 Palestinians in the Gaza Strip and the West Bank since 2016, primarily teenagers.

See also 
 Hamstringing
 Tarring and feathering

Citations

General sources 

 
 
 
 
 
 
 

Assault
Knee
Knee injuries and disorders
Torture
The Troubles (Northern Ireland)
Vigilantism
Human rights abuses in the State of Palestine